Loepp is a surname of Dutch origin. Notable people with the surname include:

George Loepp (1901–1967), American baseball player
Susan Loepp (born 1967), American mathematician
Tom Loepp (born 1954), American painter

References

Surnames of Dutch origin